Lasse Berg Johnsen (né Egeland; born 18 August 1999) is a Norwegian footballer who plays as a central midfielder for Randers.

Career
On 28 November 2018, Berg Johnsen signed a professional contract with Viking FK. He made his senior league debut for the club in a 2–1 win against Brann on 13 April 2019, coming on as a substitute. On 29 May 2019, he was loaned out to 1. divisjon club Tromsdalen. Berg Johnsen's contract with Viking expired at the end of the 2019 season.

On 23 January 2020, he signed a two-year contract with 1. divisjon club Raufoss. One year later, on 1 February 2021, he joined Danish Superliga club Randers.

Career statistics

Notes

Honours
Viking
Norwegian Football Cup: 2019

Randers
Danish Cup: 2020–21

References

1999 births
Living people
Sportspeople from Stavanger
Norwegian footballers
Viking FK players
Tromsdalen UIL players
Raufoss IL players
Randers FC players
Norwegian Third Division players
Norwegian First Division players
Eliteserien players
Danish Superliga players
Association football midfielders
Norwegian expatriate footballers
Expatriate men's footballers in Denmark
Norwegian expatriate sportspeople in Denmark